Lodi High School can refer to one of many schools. The following list is ordered by state/province/territory and then municipality:

Lodi High School (California) - Lodi, California
Lodi High School (New Jersey) - Lodi, New Jersey
Lodi High School (Wisconsin) - Lodi, Wisconsin

See also
 Lodi (disambiguation)
 Lodi Public Schools